The Battle of Pucará (Spanish: Batalla de Pucará) was fought on February 5, 1882, during the Sierra Campaign of the War of the Pacific. With a two-to-one superiority in numbers and even more in artillery, the Chilean army under the command of Colonel Estanislao del Canto was unable to destroy the little Peruvian army of General Cáceres, and withdrew to the town of Pucará leaving the Peruvian army to continue its strategic retreat.

Notes

Pucara
Pucara
Battles of the War of the Pacific
History of Junín Region
1882 in Chile
1882 in Peru
February 1882 events